XHRK-FM is a radio station in Monterrey, Nuevo León. Broadcasting on 95.7 FM, XHRK is owned by Grupo Radio Alegría and carries a grupera format known as La Sabrosita.

History
XHRK began life as XEBJB-FM, authorized for 96.5 MHz and awarded on March 18, 1964. The station remained authorized as such through the 1960s. By the 1980s, XEBJB-FM had become XHRK-FM on its current frequency of 95.7 (a move-in, XHMSN-FM, would take the 96.5 frequency in 2012).

References

Radio stations in Monterrey